Kurt Armbruster (16 September 1934 – 14 March 2019) was a Swiss football midfielder who played for Switzerland in the 1966 FIFA World Cup. He also played for FC Lausanne-Sport.

References

External links

1934 births
2019 deaths
1966 FIFA World Cup players
Association football midfielders
FC Lausanne-Sport players
Swiss men's footballers
Switzerland international footballers
Footballers from Zürich